Go to the Top may refer to:

 Go to the Top (album), a 1995 album by Hitomi
 "Go to the Top" (song), a 2012 single by Koda Kumi